Dongjum is a village in Waadhoeke in the province Friesland of the Netherlands and has around the 326 citizens as of January 2014.

History 
Before 2018, the village was part of the Franekeradeel municipality. Dongjum consists of a group Artificial dwelling hills, on an old bank of a watercourse. The area needs as demonstrated by archaeological research already in Roman times have been occupied. From pottery excavated at the time that the residents were quite wealthy. From the end of the Roman Empire until the 5th century the area was uninhabited for all thoughts.

Goslinga State 
In the early 17th century was the stins Goslinga State built where later grietman and statesman Sicco van Goslinga lived who died in 1731. The stins was demolished in 1803. In the church of Dongjum (1777) is a mausoleum of Sicco van Goslinga.

Community 
Together with the nearby hamlet  Boer, has Dongjum Since April 1969 the Association Village Importance Dongjum / Boer. The association maintain contacts with the municipality, housing association and social work. Dongjum have a public primary school called "De Twirre" Beside the school stands the villagehouse built in 2007 called De Boppeslach.

Population 
 1954 - 358
 1959 - 358
 1964 - 325
 1969 - 352
 1974 - 423
 2004 - 362

Gallery

References

External links

 

Waadhoeke
Populated places in Friesland